AM-938 (part of the AM cannabinoid series)  is an analgesic drug which is a cannabinoid receptor agonist. It is a derivative of HU-210 which has been substituted with a 6β-(3-hydroxyprop-1-ynyl) group. This adds a "southern" aliphatic hydroxyl group to the molecule as seen in the CP-series of nonclassical cannabinoid drugs, and so AM-938 represents a hybrid structure between the classical and nonclassical cannabinoid families, with the 6-hydroxyalkyl chain rigidified with a triple bond. This gives AM-938 a greater degree of selectivity, so while it is still a potent agonist at both CB1 and CB2, it is reasonably selective for CB2, with a Ki of 0.3nM at CB2 and 1.2nM at CB1, a selectivity of around 4x.

See also 
 AM-4030 - double bond instead of a triple bond
 AM-919 - saturated rather than a triple bond
 HU-243 - "southern" side chain replaced by methyl unit

References 

Benzochromenes
Primary alcohols
Phenols
AM cannabinoids